Capstan is an elevated station under construction on the Canada Line of Metro Vancouver's SkyTrain rapid transit system. It will be located at the intersection of No. 3 Road and McMyn Way, one block north of Capstan Way in Richmond, British Columbia, Canada, and will be the first infill station on the Canada Line when completed. It is expected to open in March 2023.

History
A station at Capstan Way in Richmond was originally planned to open shortly after the rest of the Canada Line but plans to construct it were cancelled in March 2009. Pinnacle International and Concord Pacific, the developers of the Sun Tech City project, could not fund the $25 million required to build the station. The developers could only offer $15 million up front, but this sum was not accepted by TransLink and the City of Richmond.

In May 2012, the City of Richmond made an agreement with TransLink and the developers to fund the project. The developers were to pay a fee of just over $8,500 per unit, with the specific amount adjusted in October to account for inflation. At the time, it was thought it would take approximately 15 years to amass the required funds. By September 2017, based on development permit applications, the full $27.8 million could be collected by mid-2018, nine years earlier than expected.

In November 2017, the City of Richmond released $3.5 million to TransLink to cover the costs of designing the station. By May 2019, $32million had been raised, exceeding the required $27.8million, which had been reached in November 2018. By December 2019, the station was still in the detailed design stage.

Initially the completion of the station was projected for mid-2022; a nearby construction conflict and internal changes at InTransitBC, the private operator of the Canada Line, later pushed this date to March 2023.

Construction
Construction of the station began on September 2, 2021, and required various service reductions and periods of single tracking on the Richmond branch of the Canada Line across several months.

References

External links

Canada Line stations
Railway stations scheduled to open in 2023
Buildings and structures in Richmond, British Columbia
Railway stations under construction in Canada